Vitex longisepala is a species of plant in the family Lamiaceae. It is a tree endemic to Peninsular Malaysia.

References

longisepala
Endemic flora of Peninsular Malaysia
Trees of Peninsular Malaysia
Least concern plants
Taxonomy articles created by Polbot